The Spain women's national futsal team represents Spain in international futsal competitions and is controlled by the Royal Spanish Football Federation.

Tournament records

World Tournament

European Championship

Current squad
Squad for Euro 2019

References

See also
Futsal in Spain
Spain women's national football team

European women's national futsal teams
W
Nat
1997 establishments in Spain